Lalbagh is situated about 3 km to the north of Hampankatta, Mangalore, India

The main office of the Mangalore City Corporation is also located here

Public utilities 

 Mangalore City Corporation Headquarters: The headquarters of the Mangalore City corporation is located in this building.

 KSRTC Bus Stand: The state-run KSRTC buses start from here, unlike the private buses which start from State Bank.

 Mangala Stadium: This stadium hosts sports events in the city.

 U S Mallya Indoor Stadium: Stadium for Basketball and Badminton

 Public swimming pool: This swimming pool is run by the city corporation and open to the public.

 Lalbagh House: This house was originally built by Mr. Rupert Fernandes then belonged to his wife Mrs. Celine Fernandes and now belongs to her youngest son Mr. Alfred Fernandes.

References

Localities in Mangalore